The Annand–Loomis House is a house located in southwest Portland, Oregon, listed on the National Register of Historic Places.  It has also been known as the John Annand House and as the Lee B. Loomis House.

It is a -story Georgian Colonial house finished in 1908 for Portland
businessman and City Commissioner John Annand and his family.  The house has views of Cascade Range peaks and of the city on plains to the north and east.  The property was nominated in part on the basis of association with Lee B. Loomis, but that historical claim was not upheld.

See also
 National Register of Historic Places listings in Southwest Portland, Oregon

References

Further reading

1908 establishments in Oregon
Colonial Revival architecture in Oregon
Houses completed in 1908
Houses on the National Register of Historic Places in Portland, Oregon
Southwest Hills, Portland, Oregon
Portland Historic Landmarks